Eleonore of Solms-Hohensolms-Lich (Eleonore Ernestine Marie; 17 September 1871 – 16 November 1937) was Grand Duchess of Hesse and by Rhine as the second wife of Grand Duke Ernest Louis. She was nicknamed "Onor" by her family. She was regent of Hesse in the absence of her spouse during World War I.

Biography

Family
She was the fourth child and second daughter of Prince Hermann of Solms-Hohensolms-Lich and Countess Agnes of Stolberg-Wernigerode.

Grand Duchess of Hesse

Eleonore married Ernest Louis, Grand Duke of Hesse in Darmstadt on 2 February 1905. By marriage, she became Grand Duchess of Hesse and by Rhine. As Grand Duchess, she took over the sponsor- and leadership of a number of charity organizations previously managed by her mother-in-law. 

When her spouse left to join the First world war in 1914, she was appointed to serve the affairs of state as regent in his absence. She was regarded as a competent regent. She equipped a hospital train to the front.

The Hesse monarchy was abolished in 1918. Eleonore continued to manage her charitable programs after the introduction of democracy.

Death
Eleonore died in an airplane crash on her way to her son Louis' wedding in London. Also killed in the crash was her elder son Georg Donatus, Hereditary Grand Duke of Hesse, his wife Princess Cecilie of Greece and Denmark, and their two sons, Ludwig and Alexander. The remains of their stillborn son was also found in the wreckage.

Orders and decorations
 : Lifesaving Medal on Band, 20 April 1898
 :
 Dame of the Order of the Golden Lion, in Diamonds, 2 February 1905
 Grand Cross of the Ludwig Order, in Diamonds, 2 February 1905

Issue
Eleonore and Ernest Louis had two sons:

Georg Donatus, Hereditary Grand Duke of Hesse and by Rhine (1906–1937), who married Princess Cecilie of Greece and Denmark (sister of Prince Philip, Duke of Edinburgh), and had issue.
Louis, Prince of Hesse and by Rhine (1908–1968). Married Hon. Margaret Campbell Geddes, daughter of Lord Geddes, no issue. He adopted Moritz, Landgrave of Hesse as heir.

Ancestry

Notes

|-

|-

1871 births
1937 deaths
Grand Duchesses of Hesse
Victims of aviation accidents or incidents in Belgium
Burials at the Mausoleum for the Grand Ducal House of Hesse, Rosenhöhe (Darmstadt)
House of Hesse-Darmstadt
House of Solms-Hohensolms-Lich
Victims of aviation accidents or incidents in 1937
20th-century women rulers
20th-century rulers in Europe